The 2019 SaarLorLux Open was a badminton tournament which took place at Saarlandhalle in Saarbrücken, Germany, from 29 October to 3 November 2019 and had a total prize of $75,000.

Tournament
The 2019 SaarLorLux Open was the tenth and last Super 100 tournament of the 2019 BWF World Tour and also part of the SaarLorLux Open championships, which has been held since 1988. This tournament was organized by German Badminton Association and sanctioned by the BWF.

Venue
This international tournament was held at Saarlandhalle in Saarbrücken, Saarland, Germany.

Point distribution
Below is the point distribution table for each phase of the tournament based on the BWF points system for the BWF Tour Super 100 event.

Prize money
The total prize money for this tournament was US$75,000. Distribution of prize money was in accordance with BWF regulations.

Men's singles

Seeds

 Mark Caljouw (withdrew)
 Misha Zilberman (second round)
 Lucas Corvée (third round)
 Ygor Coelho de Oliveira (third round)
 Toby Penty (semi-finals)
 Toma Junior Popov (second round)
 Lin Yu-hsien (third round)
 Lakshya Sen (champion)

Finals

Top half

Section 1

Section 2

Bottom half

Section 3

Section 4

Women's singles

Seeds

 Saina Nehwal (withdrew)
 Carolina Marín (withdrew)
 Yvonne Li (semi-finals)
 Sabrina Jaquet (second round)
 Lianne Tan (quarter-finals)
 Julie Dawall Jakobsen (second round)
 Ji Shuting (withdrew)
 Ksenia Polikarpova (second round)

Finals

Top half

Section 1

Section 2

Bottom half

Section 3

Section 4

Men's doubles

Seeds

 Marcus Ellis / Chris Langridge (quarter-finals)
 Mark Lamsfuß / Marvin Emil Seidel (withdrew)
 Ben Lane / Sean Vendy (semi-finals)
 Alexander Dunn / Adam Hall (quarter-finals)
 Di Zijian / Wang Chang (champions)
 Jones Ralfy Jansen / Peter Käsbauer (semi-finals)
 Mathias Bay-Smidt / Lasse Mølhede (final)
 Mads Pieler Kolding / Carsten Mogensen (second round)

Finals

Top half

Section 1

Section 2

Bottom half

Section 3

Section 4

Women's doubles

Seeds

 Maiken Fruergaard / Sara Thygesen (semi-finals)
 Chloe Birch / Lauren Smith (final)
 Liu Xuanxuan / Xia Yuting (champions)
 Linda Efler / Isabel Herttrich (semi-finals)
 Pooja Dandu / Sanjana Santosh (second round)
 Anastasiia Akchurina / Olga Morozova (quarter-finals)
 Chen Xiaofei / Zhou Chaomin (second round)
 Jenny Moore / Victoria Williams (quarter-finals)

Finals

Top half

Section 1

Section 2

Bottom half

Section 3

Section 4

Mixed doubles

Seeds

 Marcus Ellis / Lauren Smith (quarter-finals)
 Mark Lamsfuß / Isabel Herttrich (withdrew)
 Marvin Emil Seidel / Linda Efler (quarter-finals)
 Sam Magee / Chloe Magee (quarter-finals)
 Ren Xiangyu / Zhou Chaomin (final)
 Guo Xinwa / Zhang Shuxian (champions)
 Dong Weijie / Chen Xiaofei (semi-finals)
 Niclas Nøhr / Sara Thygesen (semi-finals)

Finals

Top half

Section 1

Section 2

Bottom half

Section 3

Section 4

References

External links
 Tournament Link

SaarLorLux Open
SaarLorLux Open
SaarLorLux Open
SaarLorLux Open
SaarLorLux Open